Francesco Puccioni (26 April 1961 – 30 January 2009), better known under his stage name Mike Francis, was an Italian singer and composer, born in Florence, Italy. Internationally, he was best known for his 1984 hit, "Survivor", and his collaborations with American singer Amii Stewart.

Career
Puccioni formed his first band at age 14 with schoolmates from l'Istituto di Studi Americano in Rome. Under the stage name Mike Francis, he had his first hit with "Survivor" in 1984 and went on to record ten studio albums. Among his best known works is the song "Friends", a duet with Amii Stewart released in 1984 which became a big hit in the UK and the Philippines.

Beginning in 2000, assisted by his brother Mario (Mari-One) and by the Maltese multi-instrumentalist Aidan Zammit, he founded the group Mystic Diversions. The group's songs were featured on many high-profile chill-out and lounge compilations. In addition to new, original song material, it also performed covers of 1970s and 1980s songs like "Float On" (by The Floaters), and "A Warm Summer Night" (by Chic). Together with the three, additional musicians for live sets consisted of Agostino Marangolo (drums), Fabio Pignatelli (bass), Marco Rinalduzzi (guitars), Giovanni Imparato (percussion and vocals), as well as Wendy Lewis and Laura Serra (backing vocals).

His 2007 album Inspired followed the cover of Van Morrison's "Someone Like You", together with Blank & Jones for the compilation album Café del Mar Vol. 12. His website states him as saying: "From that moment many other songs were born[;] in a simple and spontaneous way, simply "inspired"..."

Death
Puccioni died aged 47 on 30 January 2009 of lung cancer in Rome. His last compilation album The Very Best of Mike Francis (All Was Missing) was released just days before his death.

Discography

Albums
1984 – Let's Not Talk About It
1985 – Features
1986 – Mike Francis
1987 – Songs (compilation)
1988 – Flashes of Life
1989 – Features of Love (reprint  Features  - 1985)
1989 – Dreams of a Lifetime (reprint   Mike Francis  - 1986)
1990 – Live at Manila (live)
1991 – Mike Francis in Italiano
1992 – Classics (compilation)
1994 – Francesco Innamorato
1995 – The Very Best – Live (live compilation)
1995 – A Different Air
1995 – A Different Air (Philippines edition)
1998 – Misteria
1998 – The Best Of (compilation)
1999 – All Rooms with a View
1999 – I Grandi Successi (compilation)
2000 – I Grandi Successi Originali – "Flashback" (compilation)
2000 – Crossing the Liquid Mirror (as Mystic Diversions)
2002 – Beneath Another Sky (as Mystic Diversions)
2003 – Colours (as Mystic Diversions)
2006 – From the Distance (as Mystic Diversions)
2007 – Wave a Little Light (as Mystic Diversions)
2007 – Inspired
2008 – Let's Not Talk About It (Japan reprint)
2008 – Flashes of Life (Japan reprint)
2009 – The Very Best of Mike Francis (All Was Missing)  (compilation)
2011 - Anthology  (compilation)
2011 - The Best of...  (compilation)

Singles
1982 – "Love Has Found You"
1983 – "Survivor"
1984 – "Let Me In" (featuring Rossana Casale)
1984 – "Friends" (with Amii Stewart)
1985 – "Features of Love"
1985 – "Together" (with Amii Stewart)
1986 – "Iron It Out"/"You Can't Get Out of My Heart"
1987 – "Suddenly Back to Me"
1988 – "Still I'm Runnin' Back to You"
1989 – "Survivor '89"
1991 – "Livin' It Up"
1991 – "Se Tu Provi"
1992 – "I Want You"
1994 – "Bellissimi Occhi Chiusi"

References

1961 births
2009 deaths
Deaths from lung cancer in Lazio
Chill-out musicians
Italian male composers
Italian Italo disco musicians
Musicians from Florence
English-language singers from Italy
20th-century Italian male singers